Misamis Oriental's 2nd congressional district is one of the two congressional districts of the Philippines in the province of Misamis Oriental. It has been represented in the House of Representatives since 1987. The district encompasses the western half of the province consisting of the city of El Salvador and the municipalities of Alubijid, Claveria, Gitagum, Initao, Jasaan, Laguindingan, Libertad, Lugait, Manticao, Naawan, Opol, Tagoloan and Villanueva. It is currently represented in the 19th Congress by Yevgeny Vincente B. Emano of the Padayon Pilipino.

Representation history

Election results

2019

2016

2013

2010

See also
Legislative districts of Misamis Oriental

References

Congressional districts of the Philippines
Politics of Misamis Oriental
1987 establishments in the Philippines
Congressional districts of Northern Mindanao
Constituencies established in 1987